Blaize may refer to:

 Blaize (given name), a given name
 Blaize (surname), a surname

See also

 Blaise (disambiguation)
 Blaizer (disambiguation)
 Blaze (disambiguation)